Sentence of Death is an EP and the debut release by German thrash metal band Destruction, released on 10 November 1984 by Steamhammer Records.

Track listing

Personnel 
 Destruction
 Schmier – bass, vocals
 Mike Sifringer – guitars
 Thomas "Tommy" Sandmann – drums

 Production
 Wolfgang Eichholz – production
 Horst Müller – engineering

References 

Destruction (band) albums
1984 debut EPs
SPV/Steamhammer EPs
Black metal EPs
Thrash metal EPs